Can You Stop the Rain is the fifteenth studio album by American singer Peabo Bryson. It was released by Columbia Records on June 4, 1991 in the United States. Following the release of All My Love (1989), his sole return release with his longtime label, Capitol Records, the singer signed with label Columbia to complete work on his next project along with Walter Afanasieff, Peter Bunetta, Rick Chudacoff, and Barry Mann. Bryson himself became instrumental in composing and producing several songs on his own for the album along with Sir Gant and Dwight W. Watkins.

Critical reception

AllMusic reviewer William Ruhlmann found that with Can You Stop the Rain "Bryson seemed to have reconciled himself to the public's view of him as primarily a balladeer, and he delivered the goods, especially on the title track [...] and on the Cynthia Weil/Barry Mann tune "Closer Than Close." Bryson helped his own cause considerably by involving himself in the writing and production of five of the 11 songs."

Chart performance
Can You Stop the Rain reached number one on the US Top R&B/Hip-Hop Albums chart, becoming Bryson's first album to do so. It also peaked at number 88 on the US Billboard 200 for the week ending September 14, 1991. This marked Bryson's highest-charting album since Straight from the Heart in 1984. In 1994, Can You Stop the Rain was certified gold by the Recording Industry Association of America (RIAA).

Track listing

Personnel and credits 
Musicians

 Peabo Bryson – lead vocals, keyboards (4, 6, 7), arrangements (4, 6, 7, 11), backing vocals (7)
 Walter Afanasieff – keyboards (1, 2, 5), synthesizers (1, 2, 5), synth bass (1, 2, 3), drums (1, 2, 5), percussion (1, 2, 5), arrangements (2), additional keyboards (3)
 Louis Biancaniello – keyboard programming (1, 5), additional rhythm programming (1, 5)
 Ren Klyce – synthesizer programming (1, 2, 5), additional drums (3), percussion (3)
 Hans Zimmer – additional synthesizer programming (1)
 Gary Cirimelli – computer programming (2, 3), synthesizers (3)
 Barry Mann – keyboards (3), synthesizers (3), drums (3), percussion (3)
 Dean Gant – keyboards (4, 6, 8), Synclavier drums (6, 8), arrangements (6, 8), bass (8)
 Dwight W. Watkins – synthesizers (4, 6, 7, 11), bass (4, 6, 7, 11), computer programming (4, 6, 7, 11), arrangements (4, 7, 11), percussion (6, 7, 11), drums (7, 11), backing vocals (7, 11), keyboards (11)
 Marc Freeman – additional programming (4, 6, 7, 11)
 Peter Jacobson – additional programming (4, 6, 7, 11)
 Brad Cole – keyboards (9)
 Reginald "Sonny" Burke – additional keyboards (9)
 Rick Chudacoff – additional keyboards (9)
 Doug Grigsby – keyboards (10)
 Dean Parks – guitar (1)
 Vernon "Ice" Black – guitar (5)
 Paul Jackson Jr. – guitar (6, 8)
 Michael Thompson – guitar (9, 10)
 Edward Emory – cymbal (6, 8)
 Peter Bunetta – drums (9)
 Kirk Whalum – saxophone (5, 9)
 Pattie Howard – backing vocals (1)
 James Ingram – backing vocals (1)
 Phil Perry – backing vocals (1)
 Brenda Russell – backing vocals (1)
 Kitty Beethoven – backing vocals (2)
 Sandy Griffith – backing vocals (2)
 Melisa Kary – backing vocals (2)
 Claytoven Richardson – backing vocals (2)
 Jeanie Tracy – backing vocals (2)
 Carl Anderson – backing vocals (3)
 Kevin Guillaume – backing vocals (3)
 Rick Nelson – backing vocals (3)
 Sandy Simmons – backing vocals (3)
 Alex Brown – backing vocals (4, 6, 8)
 Carl Carwell – backing vocals (4, 6, 8)
 Lynn Davis – backing vocals (4, 6, 8)
 Mortonette Jenkins – backing vocals (4, 6, 8)
 Regina Belle – lead vocals (5)
 Sophia Bender – backing vocals (7, 11)
 Karen Harris – backing vocals (7, 11)
 Terri Wade – backing vocals (7, 11)
 Ada Dyer – backing vocals (9, 10)
 Lani Groves – backing vocals (9, 10)
 Curtis King – backing vocals (9, 10)

Production

 Don Ienner – executive producer 
 Jay Landers – executive producer
 Walter Afanasieff – executive producer (3)
 Dana Jon Chappelle – engineer (1, 2, 5), mixing (1, 2, 5)
 Andy Grassi – assistant engineer (1, 2)
 Manny LaCarrubba – assistant engineer (1, 2, 3)
 Gragg Lunsford – assistant engineer (2)
 Rich Travali – assistant engineer (2)
 Chris Hufford – engineer (3)
 Mick Guzauski – mixing (3, 9, 10)
 Thom Kidd – recording (4, 6, 7, 8, 11), mixing (4, 6, 7, 8, 11)
 Craig Burbidge – additional overdub recording (4, 6, 7, 8, 11)
 Leon Johnson – recording (9, 10)
 Richard Hasal – assistant engineer (9, 10)
 Fred Kevorkian – assistant engineer (9, 10)
 Jan Lucas – assistant engineer (9, 10)
 Matt Pakucko – assistant engineer (9, 10)
 Vlado Meller – mastering 
 Arnold Levine – art direction, design 
 E.J. Camp – photography 
 David M. Franklin – management

Studios

 Recorded at Boxer Sound; Record Plant (Sausalito, CA); Tempo Recording (Santa Monica, CA); Preferred Sound (Woodland Hills, CA); Beat Street Studios (North Hollywood, CA); Ground Control Studios (Burbank, CA); The Hit Factory and Sear Sound (New York, NY); Cheshire Sound Studios (Atlanta, GA).
 Mixed at Record Plant; Cheshire Sound Studios; Cornerstone Studios (Chatsworth, CA).
 Mastered at Sony Music Studio Operations (New York, NY).

Charts

Certifications

References 

1991 albums
Peabo Bryson albums